The 2018 CONMEBOL Libertadores de Beach Soccer was the third edition of the Copa Libertadores de Beach Soccer (known natively in Spanish as the Copa Libertadores de Futbol Playa), an annual continental beach soccer club tournament contested primarily between the champions of the domestic leagues of South American nations who are members of CONMEBOL. A total of 12 clubs took part.

Announced on 31 May, the tournament took place between 26 November and 2 December in Rio de Janeiro, Brazil. It was organised by CONMEBOL in cooperation will local entities: the Brazilian Football Confederation (CBF) and Brazil Beach Soccer Confederation (CBSB) The event was originally due to take place in Belém, Pará State, Brazil but a change of venue was announced on 23 October.

Brazilians Vasco da Gama were the defending champions but finished as runners-up to fellow Brazilian club Vitória who claimed their first title.

Format
As per Regulations Article 15, the tournament starts with a group stage, played in a round robin format. The winners, runners-up and two best third placed teams from each group advance to the knockout stage, in which the teams then compete in single-elimination matches, beginning with the quarter-finals and ending with the final. A third-place deciding match is also contested by the losing semi-finalists.

Unlike the two previous editions, there are no consolation matches to decide 5th to 12th place; these placements are instead decided statistically (Regulations Articles 22 & 23).

Teams
Twelve teams qualified; each domestic league champion from the ten South American nations which are members of CONMEBOL, plus an additional club from the host country and the defending champions.

1. Brazil entered three clubs: a. Vasco da Gama qualify as reigning champions, b. the Brazilian league champions, Sampaio Corrêa, c. the host country is also awarded an additional berth which went to the league runners-up, Vitória.

Venue

One venue was used in the city of Rio de Janeiro.
All matches took place at a purpose built arena at Barra Olympic Park, just outside the Olympic Tennis Centre.

Squads
Each team had to submit a squad of 12 players, including a minimum of two goalkeepers (Regulations Article 33).

Draw
The draw to split the twelve teams into three groups of four took place on 19 November at 19:00 local time in Rio de Janeiro, Brazil at the headquarters of the  Brazilian Football Confederation. The draw was conducted based on Regulations Article 16 as follows:

Initially, three teams were seeded and assigned to the head of the groups (Vasco da Gama automatically, the others via a draw):  

to Group A: 2017 Copa Libertadores champions,  Vasco da Gama
to Group B: champions of the host association,  Sampaio Corrêa
to Group C: club of the runner-up national association of the 2017 Copa Libertadores,  Bella Vista

The remaining nine teams were split into three pots of three based on the final placement of their national association's club in the previous edition of the championship, with the highest seeds placed in Pot 1 down to the lowest placed in Pot 3 (the additional Brazilian team was also placed in Pot 3). From each pot, the first team drawn was placed into Group A, the second team drawn placed into Group B and the final team drawn placed into Group C. Teams from the same association could not be drawn into the same group.

Group stage
The match schedule was revealed on the day of the draw.

Each team earns three points for a win in regulation time, two points for a win in extra time, one point for a win in a penalty shoot-out, and no points for a defeat. The top two teams of each group, plus the two best ranked third-placed teams, advance to the quarter-finals. The rankings of teams in each group are determined as follows (Regulations Article 21):

If two or more teams are equal on the basis of the above criterion, their rankings are determined as follows:

All times are local, BRST (UTC–2)

Group A

Group B

Group C

Ranking of third-placed teams

As per Regulations Article 17, it was decided the third place teams would take the following berths in the quarter-final draw:
1st Group A vs 2nd best third place team 
1st Group B vs Best third place team
1st Group C vs 2nd Group A 
2nd Group B vs 2nd Group C

Knockout stage
The group winners, runners-up and two best third placed teams progressed to the knockout stage to continue to compete for the title.

Quarter-finals

Semi-finals

Third place play-off

Final

Final standings

Note1  Regulations Article 22 outlines the criteria for defining the teams that finish in 5th–8th place
Note2  Regulations Article 23 outlines the criteria for defining the teams that finish in 9th–12th place

References

External links
CONMEBOL Libertadores Fútbol Playa Brasil 2018, at CONMEBOL.com (in Spanish)

2018
Copa
2018
2018 in beach soccer
November 2018 sports events in South America
December 2018 sports events in South America
2018 in South American football